Performance is a 1970 soundtrack album to the film Performance by Donald Cammell and Nicolas Roeg. It features music from Randy Newman, Merry Clayton, Ry Cooder, Jack Nitzsche, Buffy Sainte-Marie, The Last Poets and Mick Jagger.

A single from the album, "Memo from Turner" sung by Mick Jagger (b/w the instrumental "Natural Magic") was released in 1970 reaching #32 on the UK singles chart.

Tracks
Side 1
 "Gone Dead Train" 2:56 - Randy Newman (Jack Nitzsche/Russ Titelman)
 "Performance" 1:49 (Bernie Krause, Merry Clayton)
 "Get Away" 2:09 (Ry Cooder)
 "Powis Square 2:25 (Ry Cooder)
 "Rolls Royce and Acid" 1:50 (Jack Nitzsche)
 "Dyed, Dead, Red" 2:35 (Buffy Sainte-Marie)
 "Harry Flowers" 4:03 (Jack Nitzsche, Randy Newman)
Side 2
 "Memo from Turner" 4:08 (Mick Jagger, Keith Richards)
 "Hashishin" 3:39 (Buffy Sainte-Marie, Ry Cooder)
 "Wake Up, Niggers" 2:47 (The Last Poets)
 "Poor White Hound Dog" 2:50 (Merry Clayton)
 "Natural Magic" 1:40 (Jack Nitzsche)
 "Turner's Murder" 4:15 (Merry Clayton Singers)

Screen credits
 Original music by Jack Nitzsche
 Conductor: Randy Newman
 Singers: Mick Jagger, Merry Clayton, Buffy Sainte-Marie
 Santoor: Nasser Rastegar-Nejad
 Moog synthesizer: Bernard Krause

Music performers
 Ry Cooder – guitar
 Amiyo Das Gupta – sitar
 Lowell George – guitar
 Milt Holland – drums, percussion
 Gene Parsons – drums, guitars
 Russ Titelman – percussion
 Bobby West – bass

References

 Performance credits

Crime film soundtracks
Albums produced by Jack Nitzsche
1970 soundtrack albums
Warner Records soundtracks